Makabe (written: 真壁) is a Japanese surname. Notable people with the surname include:

, Japanese rugby union player
, Japanese professional wrestler
, Japanese judoka

Japanese-language surnames